Phyllarthron is a genus of flowering plants belonging to the family Bignoniaceae.

Its native range is Comoros and Madagascar.

Species
Species:

Phyllarthron antongiliense 
Phyllarthron articulatum 
Phyllarthron bernierianum 
Phyllarthron bilabiatum 
Phyllarthron bojeranum  syn. Phyllarthron madagascariensis, Arthrophyllum madagascariense
Phyllarthron cauliflorum 
Phyllarthron comorense 
Phyllarthron humblotianum 
Phyllarthron ilicifolium 
Phyllarthron laxinervium 
Phyllarthron longipedunculatum 
Phyllarthron megaphyllum 
Phyllarthron megapterum 
Phyllarthron multiflorum 
Phyllarthron nocturnum 
Phyllarthron sahamalazensis 
Phyllarthron suarezense 
Phyllarthron subumbellatum 
Phyllarthron vokoaninensis

References

Bignoniaceae
Bignoniaceae genera